The Ilchester Cheese Company is a cheese company based in Ilchester, Somerset. The Ilchester brands are part of Norseland, a subsidiary of Norwegian dairy company Tine SA.

History

In 1962, Ken Seaton, a hotelier in Ilchester, Somerset, England, tried combining cheese with chives, Worthington E Bitter beer and a blend of spices.  This and other blended cheeses are manufactured and distributed by the Ilchester Cheese Company.

The company received farm subsidies from the European Union of €891,256 between 2001 and 2005.

Products
Ilchester do not actually manufacture any cheese from scratch, but specialise in blending a variety of British cheeses with other ingredients, such as beer and fruit. Notable Ilchester cheeses include Applewood, a smoke-flavoured Cheddar cheese, and Five Counties, which is a sandwich of five layers of different English cheeses.

The company also produces vegan cheeses.

References

External links
Company website

Somerset cuisine
Dairy products companies of the United Kingdom
Companies based in Somerset
British cheeses